Karen Lewis (born 1950s) is an American television soap opera writer.

Positions held
All My Children
Screenwriter: 1985 - 1997, October 2001 - October 17, 2007
Script editor: 1997 - 1999

As the World Turns
 Script editor: 1999 - 2000

Awards and nominations
Daytime Emmy Award
 Nominations; 1988, 1990–1993, 1995–1999, 2003 and 2004; Best Writing; All My Children
 Wins; 1988, and 1996–1999; Best Writing; All My Children
 Nominations; 2000 and 2001; Best Writing; As The World Turns
 Win; 2001; Best Writing; As the World Turns

Writers Guild of America Award
 Nominations; 1989–1991, 1993, and 1995-1999 seasons; All My Children
 Wins; 1996, 1998 and 2003 seasons; All My Children

External links

References 

American soap opera writers
American women television writers
Daytime Emmy Award winners
Writers Guild of America Award winners
1950s births
Living people
Place of birth missing (living people)
Date of birth missing (living people)
Year of birth missing (living people)
Women soap opera writers
21st-century American women writers